A list of the oldest schools in Wiltshire, England, in the order of their date of foundation.

Schools still in operation

Former schools

See also
List of the oldest schools in the United Kingdom
List of schools in Wiltshire

References

Wiltshire
Wiltshire
 
Schools, oldest